The Anglican Church of St James at Ashley in the Cotswold District of Gloucestershire, England was built in the Norman period and rebuilt around 1200. It is a grade II* listed building.

History

The Norman church was rebuilt around 1200. In 1848 it was restored and the chancel rebuilt.

The parish is part of the Braydon Brook benefice within the Diocese of Bristol.

Architecture

The stone building has slate roofs. It consists on a nave, chancel and south aisle with a two-stage 15th century west tower with gargoyles. The south porch Norman doorway has a lintel and tympanum.

References

Ashley
Ashley